Bakers Beach is a locality and small rural community in the local government area of Latrobe in the North West region of Tasmania.
The 2016 census determined a population of 60 for the state suburb of Bakers Beach.

History
The area was first settled in 1833 by George Hall, and remained a farm until 1974. The beach was named for the second owner, Edwin Baker.

Geography
The shore of Bass Strait forms the northern boundary and the waters of the Rubicon Estuary abut the western boundary.

Road infrastructure
The C740 route (Bakers Beach Road) runs through the locality from south to north, terminating at the Narawntapu National Park. Route C741 (Browns Creek Road) starts at an intersection with C740 and runs through from west to east, where it follows the eastern boundary for a short distance before continuing into York Town.

References

Localities of Latrobe Council
Towns in Tasmania